The Lithuania men's national 3x3 team is a national basketball team of Lithuania, administered by the Lithuanian Basketball Federation. It represents the country in international 3x3 (3 against 3) basketball competitions.

World Cup record

See also
Lithuania national basketball team

References

External links

Basketball in Lithuania
Basketball teams in Lithuania
Men's national 3x3 basketball teams
3